The OTI Festival 1972 was the very first edition of the annual OTI Festival and was held in Madrid, Spain. Organised by the Organización de Televisión Iberoamericana (OTI) and host broadcaster Televisión Española (TVE), the contest was held at the Palacio de Exposiciones y Congresos auditorium on Saturday 25 November 1972 and was hosted by Rosa María Mateo and Raúl Matas.

14 countries were expected to debut in the festival, but Mexico was disqualified because their entry was considered non suitable for political reasons. Of the remaining 13 performers who took the stage, the winner was the Brazilian entrants Claudia Regina and Tobías with their song "Dialogo" (Dialogue), which was performed in Portuguese.

Background 
The Organización de Televisión Iberoamericana (OTI) was formed in 1971 as a tool of exchange of news and audiovisual contents of any kind between the active member broadcasters. As a part of those goals, the organisation agreed to create a song competition following the example of the Eurovision Song Contest in order to promote the artistic fellowship between all the Spanish and Portuguese speaking countries and peoples.

Venue 
The members of the organisation agreed to locate the first edition of the OTI Festival in Madrid, the Spanish Capital City. The venue of the show would be the Congress Palace of Madrid with a seat capacity for over 1500 people. This centre, which was at that time, the biggest convention-oriented building of Spain is located in La Castellana district, in the central part of Madrid. The building was built by Pablo Pintado y Riba with well known aportations by Llorens Artigas and Joan Miró. It was started in 1964 and was finished in 1970, two years before the start of the OTI festival.

Participating countries 
The national or private broadcasters (and OTI members) from Spain, Portugal and almost from all the Spanish or Portuguese speaking countries of South America and some of the Caribbean Islands took part in the event. Mexico had initially expressed its desire to take part in the event. In fact Televisa, the national TV Station of Mexico had selected Roberto Cantoral as their representative with the song "Yo no voy a la guerra" (I won't fight in the war), but the entry was disqualified because both the OTI and some voices in Francoist Spain considered that the song had political intentions, what made it unsuitable to compete in the show.

Presenters 
The first OTI Festival was presented by the Chilean well known journalist and radio celebrity Raúl Matas and by the Spanish news journalist Rosa María Mateo. The presenters gave an inaugural speech in which they highlighted the main goal of the festival, which was to generate a process of cultural and artistic unity between the countries that form the Latin-sphere.

After the inaugural speech, the master and mistress of ceremony made brief individual presentations of the entrants short before they entered the stage.

Running order 
The Running order of the show was decided in a draw which was organised by the Iberoamerican Television Organisation some days before the event took place.

The show was started by Bolivia. The Andean country was represented by Arturo Quesada with "No volveré a pasar por allí". The host country, Spain, which was represented by Marisol, performed fourth during the night, while the Dominican entrant Fernando Casado ended the performances.

Almost all the participating entries were sung in Spanish, except the ones coming from Portugal and Brazil.

Voting system 
The winner of the festival was chosen by 13 national juries which were composed each one of five members, which made a total number of 65 jurors. Each one of the members of the juries voted only for their favourite entry directly connected by telephone.

The host broadcaster, in this case, TVE, called the TV studios of the participating broadcasters in order to know the choice of the jurors. Almost all the countries gave their votes by telephone except for Bolivia and the Dominican Republic, whose broadcasters had to send their jurors to Madrid because of the bad state of the telephone lines in these countries.

Voting process

Result 
The first winner of the festival was the Brazilian duo Claudia Regina and Tobías with their song "Diálogo" (Dialogue), which was the absolute favourite and won with 10 points, only two points more than the runner-up, who was Basilio, the entrant from Panama.

The third place went to the Spanish actress and singer Marisol, who got seven points.

Both Venezuela and Puerto Rico were tied in fourth place, while Chile and the Dominican Republic were also tied in second to last place.

Five countries were also tied in last place; Bolivia, Colombia, Perú, Uruguay and Argentina were the less favoured entries and received 3 points from the international jurors.

Audience 
The first OTI Festival was broadcast live from Spain to Latin America and the Spanish Speaking TV Stations of the United States. Although Spain and the Latin American Countries are separated by a wide time difference, the show was an enormous success which was seen by over one hundred millions of people in all the Spanish and Portuguese speaking countries.

México was the country where the viewing figures were the highest although the country had been disqualified.

References

External links 

OTI Festival by year
1972 music festivals
Music festivals in Spain
1972 in Latin music